Watership Down can refer to:

Places
Watership Down, Hampshire, the hill in England around which the novel is set

Art, entertainment, and media

Fiction
Watership Down (1972), a successful adventure novel by Richard Adams
Tales from Watership Down (1996), a collection of 19 short stories by Richard Adams, written as a follow-up to his 1972 novel

Film and television
Watership Down (film), a 1978 animated film based on Adams's novel
Watership Down (TV series), a 1999-2001 animated television series based on Adams's novel
Watership Down (2018 TV series), a 2018 animated programme co-produced by Netflix and the BBC based on Adams's novel

Music
Watership Down (band), an alternative metal band from Mississippi
"Watership Down", song on America's 1976 album Hideaway